The Pioneers of Islamic Revival is a 1994 book edited by Ali Rahnema in which the authors examine prominent figures in the modern Islamic political revival.

Essays
 Sayyid Jamal al-Din al-Afghani / Nikki R. Keddie
 Muhammad Abduh: pioneer of Islamic reform / Yvonne Haddad
 Khomeini's search for perfection: theory and reality / Baqer Moin
 Mawdudi and the Jama'at-i Islami: the origins, theory and practice of Islamic revivalism / Seyyed Vali Reza Nasr
 Hasan al-Banna (1906-1949) / David Commins
 Sayyid Qutb: the political vision / Charles R. H. Tripp
 Musa al-Sadr / Augustus Richard Norton
 Ali Shariati: teacher, preacher, rebel / Ali Rahnema
 Muhammad Baqer as-Sadr / Chibli Mallat

Reception
The book has been reviewed in Middle Eastern Studies, Review of Middle East Studies and International Socialism.

Chris Harman believes that this book is welcome because many liberals who "lump all strands of political Islam (or ‘Islamism’) together", show a complete ignorance of "the history of political Islam and of the myriad of different organisations and beliefs that fall under that title today."

John Cooper calls the book "a judicious and well-conceived collection" which is useful for anyone "concerned with the politics of the modern Islamic world".

References

External links 
The Pioneers of Islamic Revival

1994 non-fiction books
English-language books
Zed Books books
Books about Islamism
2006 non-fiction books
Works about Ruhollah Khomeini
Works about Ali Shariati
Edited volumes